Andrew Kim is an American intelligence officer.

Andrew Kim may also refer to:

 Andrew Kim (politician) (born 1982), American politician
 Andrew Kim Taegon (1821-1846), Roman Catholic saint of Korean clergy
 Shrine of Saint Andrew Kim, in Bulacan, Philippines

See also 
 Andy Kim (disambiguation)